Gary Sampson may refer to:

 Gary Sampson (ice hockey) (born 1959), retired American ice hockey player
 Gary Lee Sampson (1959–2021), convicted murderer in Massachusetts, United States
 Gary P. Sampson, Australian economist

See also
Gary Samson (born 1951), American filmmaker and photographer